Marquette Heights is a city in Tazewell County, Illinois, United States. The population was 2,824 at the 2010 census. Marquette Heights is a suburb of Peoria and is part of the Peoria, Illinois Metropolitan Statistical Area.

Geography

Demographics

As of the census of 2000, there were 2,794 people, 982 households, and 815 families residing in the city. The racial makeup of the city was 98.21% White, 0.39% African American, 0.07% Native American, 0.25% Asian, 0.39% from other races, and 0.68% from two or more races. Hispanic or Latino of any race were 1.32% of the population.

There were 982 households, out of which 38.9% had children under the age of 18 living with them, 68.1% were married couples living together, 9.8% had a female householder with no husband present, and 17.0% were non-families. 14.1% of all households were made up of individuals, and 4.4% had someone living alone who was 65 years of age or older. The average household size was 2.85 and the average family size was 3.08.

In the city, the population was spread out, with 28.5% under the age of 18, 8.2% from 18 to 24, 30.3% from 25 to 44, 25.1% from 45 to 64, and 7.9% who were 65 years of age or older. The median age was 34 years. For every 100 females, there were 101.3 males. For every 100 females age 18 and over, there were 98.7 males.

The median income for a household in the city was $47,073, and the median income for a family was $50,714. Males had a median income of $40,870 versus $23,674 for females. The per capita income for the city was $17,935. About 2.7% of families and 2.9% of the population were below the poverty line, including 0.9% of those under age 18 and none of those age 65 or over.

References

External links
 City of Marquette Heights website

Cities in Illinois
Cities in Tazewell County, Illinois
Peoria metropolitan area, Illinois